Bagas Adi Nugroho (born 8 March 1997, in Yogyakarta) is an Indonesian professional footballer who plays for Liga 1 club Arema and the Indonesia national team. Although usually deployed as a centre-back, he is also capable of playing as a left-back.

Club career

Persipasi Bandung Raya
On 2015, Bagas joined in the Persipasi Bandung Raya squad for 2015 Jenderal Sudirman Cup.

PSS Sleman
Bagas joined PSS Sleman in the round of 16 2016 Indonesia Soccer Championship B. Bagas made his debut for PSS on 16 October 2016 in a 1–0 win against Persita Tangerang. During his time for PSS Sleman, he played well with PSS Sleman for 3 months and managed to bring PSS as runner up in the 2016 ISC B tournament.

Arema
After from PSS Sleman, Bagas joined Arema along with Hanif Sjahbandi on 23 January 2017. And he immediately brought his new club to the champions 2017 Indonesia President's Cup. Bagas made his league debut on 15 April 2017 in a match against Persib Bandung in the Liga 1.

In January 2019, Arema's general manager Ruddy Widodo revealed that Bagas would be leaving the club, Bagas will definitely not join Arema FC in 2019 Liga 1.

Bhayangkara
He was signed for Bhayangkara to play in Liga 1 in the 2019 season. Bagas made his debut on 31 August 2019 in a match against Persebaya Surabaya.

Return to Arema
On 2020, it was confirmed that Bagas Adi would re-join Arema, signing a year contract. He made his debut on 2 March 2020 in a match against TIRA-Persikabo. This season was suspended on 27 March 2020 due to the COVID-19 pandemic. The season was abandoned and was declared void on 20 January 2021.

International career 
He made his international debut for senior team on 21 March 2017, against Myanmar.

Career statistics

Club

International

International under-19 goals

International under-23 goals

Honours

Club 
Sriwijaya U-21
 Indonesia Super League U-21: 2012–13
Arema
 Indonesia President's Cup: 2017, 2022

International 
Indonesia U-23
 AFF U-22 Youth Championship: 2019
 Southeast Asian Games  Silver medal: 2019
Indonesia
 Aceh World Solidarity Cup runner-up: 2017

References

External links 

 Bagas Adi Nugroho at Soccerway
 

1997 births
Living people
Indonesian footballers
People from Yogyakarta
Pelita Bandung Raya players
PSS Sleman players
Arema F.C. players
Bhayangkara F.C. players
Liga 1 (Indonesia) players
Sportspeople from Special Region of Yogyakarta
Indonesia youth international footballers
Indonesia international footballers
Association football defenders
Footballers at the 2018 Asian Games
Asian Games competitors for Indonesia
Competitors at the 2019 Southeast Asian Games
Southeast Asian Games silver medalists for Indonesia
Southeast Asian Games medalists in football